Jonathan David Salt (born 6 January 1991) is an English cricketer.  Salt is a right-handed batsman, but his bowling style is unknown.  He was born in Chester, Cheshire and was educated at Poole Grammar School.

While studying for his degree in Law at Durham University, Salt made his first-class debut for Durham MCCU against Yorkshire in 2011.  In his only first-class match to date, Salt claimed a single wicket, that of Gary Ballance, for the cost of 93 runs in the match.

References

External links
 Jonathan Salt at ESPNcricinfo
 Jonathan Salt at CricketArchive

1991 births
Living people
Sportspeople from Chester
People educated at Poole Grammar School
Alumni of Durham University
English cricketers
Durham MCCU cricketers
Dorset cricketers